Lepidogobius lepidus, the bay goby or finescale goby, is a species of goby native to the Pacific coast of North America from British Columbia, Canada to Baja California, Mexico where it can be found on muddy substrates from the intertidal zone to .  This species grows to a length of  TL.  This species is the only known member of its genus.

Members of this genus have been found in Pleistocene deposits.

References

Gobionellinae
Fish described in 1858